Taranagar Assembly constituency is one of constituencies of Rajasthan Legislative Assembly in the Churu (Lok Sabha constituency).

Taranagar Constituency covers all voters from Taranagar tehsil, parts of Rajgarh tehsil, which include ILRC Dadarewa, ILRC Dokwa and part of Sardarshahar tehsil, which includes ILRC Ratoosar.

Members of the Legislative Assembly

References

See also 
 List of constituencies of the Rajasthan Legislative Assembly
 Churu district

Churu district
Assembly constituencies of Rajasthan